Neocollyris horsfieldi is a species of ground beetle in the family Carabidae. It was described by William Macleay in 1825. N. horsfieldi is found in Indonesia and was named for Thomas Horsfield, an American naturalist who had worked extensively in that country.

Notes

References

Horsfieldi, Neocollyris
Beetles described in 1825